Chotin may refer to several places in middle Europe:

Chotín, a village in south Slovakia in Komarno District.
Khotyn, a village in Chernivtsi Oblast in Ukraine.